Benjamin D. North House is a historic home located at Middlefield in Otsego County, New York. It was built between 1799 and 1802 and is a two-story, five-bay, center-hall plan Federal style bank dwelling. It is built of brick with a -story frame wing. Also on the property is a smokehouse (ca. 1800), a small frame privy with clapboard siding (ca. 1850), and a horse barn built about 1800 with a substantial extension added about 1890.

It was listed on the National Register of Historic Places in 1985.

References

Houses on the National Register of Historic Places in New York (state)
Federal architecture in New York (state)
Houses completed in 1802
Houses in Otsego County, New York
National Register of Historic Places in Otsego County, New York